Wesley Koolhof and Neal Skupski defeated Ariel Behar and Gonzalo Escobar in the final, 7–6(7–5), 6–4, to win the men's doubles tennis title at the 2022 Adelaide International 2.

This was the second edition of the Adelaide International held in 2022.

Seeds
All seeds received a bye into the second round.

Draw

Finals

Top half

Bottom half

References

External links
Main draw

Adelaide International 2 - Doubles
2022 Men's Doubles 2
Adelaide